Åke Bertil Sixten Berntsson (also Berndtsson, 11 June 1934 – 7 June 2016) was a Swedish rower. He competed in the eights at the 1960 Summer Olympics, but failed to reach the final.

References

External links 
 
 

1934 births
2016 deaths
Swedish male rowers
Olympic rowers of Sweden
Rowers at the 1960 Summer Olympics